Araeolaimus is a genus of marine free living nematodes.

References 

 Araeolaimus at WoRMS

Chromadorea genera
Araeolaimida
Taxa named by Johannes Govertus de Man